The 2002 Basingstoke and Deane Council election took place on 2 May 2002 to elect members of Basingstoke and Deane Borough Council in Hampshire, England. The whole council was up for election with boundary changes since the last election in 2000 increasing the number of seats by 3. The council stayed under no overall control.

Background
Before the election the Labour and Liberal Democrat parties had run the council together for the previous 7 years. Since the 2000 election both the parties had 15 seats, so they had 4 cabinet seats each and shared the leadership of the council for 6 months each.

Boundary changes increased the number of seats to 60 from the previous 57. This meant all of the seats were being contested instead of the usual one third of the council.

The Conservatives hoped to take control of the council and the local party was supported by visits from the national Conservative leader Iain Duncan Smith and the party chairman David Davis. The Conservatives said their campaign focused on issues such as youth crime, but were accused by the Liberal Democrat leader of the council, Brian Gurden, of running a negative campaign.

Election result
The results saw the Conservatives remain the largest party, but they remained on 25 seats. 
As a result, the Liberal Democrat and Labour coalition remained in control of the council with 32 of the 60 seats between them.

The Liberal Democrats made a net gain of 2 seats, after picking up 3 seats and losing 1. This included taking seats in Eastrop and Tadley North from other parties and meant the Liberal Democrats had 17 seats, compared to 15 for Labour. This meant Liberal Democrat Brian Gurden remained as leader of the council.

Meanwhile, both sitting independent councillors were re-elected and a third, Ian Tilbury, gained a seat in Overton. 4 sitting councillors were defeated at the election, 3 Labour, Pam Lonie, Carl Reader and Rose Wellman, and 1 Conservative, Robert Musson. Overall turnout in the election was 34.3%, an increase from 29% in 2000.

Ward results

References

2002
2002 English local elections
2000s in Hampshire